Stephen Allen Benson (May 21, 1816 – January 24, 1865) was a Liberian politician who served as the second president of Liberia from 1856 to 1864. Prior to that, he served as the third vice president of Liberia from 1854 to 1856 under President Joseph Jenkins Roberts. Born in the United States, Benson was the first president to have lived in Liberia since childhood, having arrived with his family in 1822.

Early life
Benson was born in Cambridge, Maryland, United States, to freeborn African-American parents. In 1822, his family emigrated to the newly established country of Liberia, sailing aboard the Brig Strong.

For four years, he was a military shopkeeper. He was also a private secretary to Thomas Buchanan, the last of Liberia's white governors. Benson later became a successful businessman. Benson joined the militia in 1835, and in 1842 became a delegate to the Colonial Council. After Liberia's independence in 1847 he became a judge. He was also a Methodist preacher. Benson was the Secretary of the Treasury before becoming the president.

Presidency (1856–64)
In 1853 Benson became the vice president to Joseph Jenkins Roberts, serving in that capacity until winning the presidency in 1856.

Foreign relations
Benson obtained diplomatic recognition for Liberia from Belgium in 1858, Denmark in 1860, the United States and Italy in 1862, Norway and Sweden in 1863, and Haiti in 1864.

Expansion
In 1857, Benson organized the annexation of the Republic of Maryland. By 1860, through treaties and purchases with local African leaders, Liberia had extended its boundaries to include a 600-mile (1000km) coastline.

Retirement
After the end of his presidency Benson retired to his coffee plantation in Grand Bassa County where he died in 1865.

Legacy
Benson is commemorated in the scientific name of a species of lizard, Trachylepis bensonii, which is endemic to Liberia.

See also
History of Liberia

References

Further reading
see History of Liberia, further reading

External links
Biography
Ricks Essay
see also History of Liberia, external links
S. A. Benson, President of Liberia  article in National Magazine,  April 1856, pages 311-317

Presidents of Liberia
Vice presidents of Liberia
Finance Ministers of Liberia
1816 births
1865 deaths
Americo-Liberian people
People from Cambridge, Maryland
People from Grand Bassa County
19th-century Liberian politicians
19th-century African-American people